Edmonton North was a federal electoral district in Alberta, Canada, that was represented in the House of Commons of Canada from 1979 to 2004.

Demographics

Geography
The riding consisted of the northern part of the city of Edmonton, Alberta.

History
It was created in 1976 from parts of Edmonton Centre, Edmonton East, Edmonton West and Pembina ridings.

It was abolished in 2003 when it was redistributed into Edmonton East, Edmonton—Sherwood Park and Edmonton—St. Albert ridings.

Members of Parliament

This riding elected the following Members of Parliament:

Election results

|-

 
|Liberal
|Jim Jacuta
|align="right"|14,786
|align="right"|34.32%
|align="right"|
|align="right"|$28,846
 
|New Democratic Party
|Laurie Lang
|align="right"|3,216
|align="right"|7.46%
|align="right"|
|align="right"|$815

|Progressive Conservative
|Dean Sanduga
|align="right"|3,010
|align="right"|6.98%
|align="right"|
|align="right"|$9,842
|- bgcolor="white"
!align="right" colspan=3|Total valid votes
!align="right"|43,075
!align="right"|100.00%
!align="right"|
|- bgcolor="white"
!align="right" colspan=3|Total rejected ballots
!align="right"|174
!align="right"|0.40%
!align="right"|
|- bgcolor="white"
!align="right" colspan=3|Turnout
!align="right"|43,249
!align="right"|57.20%
!align="right"|

|-

 
|Liberal
|Jonathan Murphy
|align="right"|11,820
|align="right"|32.47%
|
|align="right"|$46,517
 
|New Democratic Party
|Ray Martin
|align="right"|5,413
|align="right"|14.87%
|
|align="right"|$60,286

|Progressive Conservative
|Mitch Panciuk
|align="right"|2,811
|align="right"|7.72%
|
|align="right"|$51,169

|Natural Law
|Ric Johnsen
|align="right"|226
|align="right"|0.62%
|align="right"|
|align="right"|
|- bgcolor="white"
!align="right" colspan=3|Total valid votes
!align="right"|36,394
!align="right"|100.00%
!
!
|- bgcolor="white"
!align="right" colspan=3|Total rejected ballots
!align="right"|99
!align="right"|0.27%
!
!
|- bgcolor="white"
!align="right" colspan=3|Turnout
!align="right"|36,493
!align="right"|55.63%
!
!

|-

See also 

 List of Canadian federal electoral districts
 Past Canadian electoral districts

External links
 
 Expenditures - 2000
 Expenditures - 1997
 Elections Canada

Former federal electoral districts of Alberta
Politics of Edmonton